Route 68 is a state highway located in Burlington County in the U.S. state of New Jersey, serving as the main connector between the New Jersey Turnpike and the Fort Dix entity of Joint Base McGuire–Dix–Lakehurst (JB MDL). The route passes through Wrightstown and Springfield Township as a two-lane undivided road, crossing CR 537. It continues through Mansfield Township as a four-lane divided highway, intersecting with CR 543. Outside of JB MDL, Route 68 passes through mostly agricultural and residential areas.

The route was originally designated as Route S39 in 1941, a spur of Route 39 (present-day US 206) that was to provide improved access to Fort Dix during World War II. In 1953, Route S39 became Route 68 and it was legislated to extend south of Fort Dix to the Four Mile Circle with Route 70 and Route 72. A freeway for Route 68 was proposed to run between a planned Route 38 freeway and the Four Mile Circle in 1960; however, it was never built.

Route description

Route 68 begins at General Circle (inaccessible to the general public) with CR 616 on the grounds of the Fort Dix entity of JB MDL in New Hanover Township, heading to the north as a four-lane divided highway called Fort Dix Road. After passing through the Main Gate to Fort Dix and heading east of the Visitor Center for Fort Dix, the road continues through public areas of the military installation and crosses into Wrightstown, where it narrows into a two-lane undivided road before heading into Springfield Township. The route exits JB MDL at its intersection with CR 670 and upon leaving the fort, it heads through a mix of farmland and woodland. Route 68 crosses CR 537 before continuing north into agricultural areas with some homes.

The road enters Mansfield Township where it widens into a four-lane divided highway as it intersects a road that provides access to parallel CR 545 to the east, which heads south to serve as an access road to McGuire Air Force Base. From here, the route turns northwest and crosses CR 543 before heading through a mix of farm fields and suburban residential neighborhoods. Past the intersection with White Pine Road, Route 68 passes in between two large auto auction lots. The route terminates at an intersection with US 206 located a short distance south of that route's interchange with the New Jersey Turnpike (Interstate 95). Route 68 serves as the main access route between Fort Dix and the New Jersey Turnpike.

History

As part of improving road access to the Fort Dix Military Reservation at the onset of World War II, a Works Progress Administration project improved the paved road connecting the fort to Bordentown. In 1941, this road was legislated as Route S39, a state highway spur of Route 39 (now US 206) that was to run from the fort to Mansfield Square. Construction on the access road was completed in 1943 at a cost of over $2 million. Route S39 became Route 68 in the 1953 New Jersey state highway renumbering. The same year, an extension of Route 68 was legislated to run south from Fort Dix to the intersection with Route 70 and Route 72 at the Four Mile Circle. In 1961, a freeway was proposed along the Route 68 corridor, running from a planned Route 38 freeway near Fort Dix south to Route 70 and Route 72; however, this was never built.

Major intersections

See also

References

External links

New Jersey Roads – History
Speed Limits for State Roads: Route 68

068
Transportation in Burlington County, New Jersey